Ralph Henry Baer (born Rudolf Heinrich Baer; March 8, 1922 – December 6, 2014) was a German-American inventor, game developer, and engineer.

Baer's family fled Germany just before World War II and Baer served the American war effort, gaining an interest in electronics shortly thereafter. Through several jobs in the electronics industry, he was working as an engineer at Sanders Associates (now BAE Systems) in Nashua, NH, when he conceived the idea of playing games on a television screen around 1966. With support of his employers, he worked through several prototypes until he arrived at a "Brown Box" that would later become the blueprint for the first home video game console, licensed by Magnavox as the Magnavox Odyssey. Baer continued to design several other consoles and computer game units, including contributing to design of the Simon electronic game. Baer continued to work in electronics until his death in 2014, with over 150 patents to his name.

Baer is considered "the Father of Video Games" due to his many contributions to games and helping to spark the video game industry in the latter half of the 20th century. In February 2006, he was awarded the National Medal of Technology for "his groundbreaking and pioneering creation, development and commercialization of interactive video games, which spawned related uses, applications, and mega-industries in both the entertainment and education realms".

Life 
Ralph Baer was born in 1922 to Lotte (Kirschbaum) and Leo Baer, a Jewish family living in Germany, in Pirmasens, and was originally named Rudolf Heinrich Baer. At age 14, he was expelled from school due to anti-Jewish legislation implemented in Nazi Germany and had to go to an all-Jewish school. His father worked in a shoe factory in Pirmasens at the time. Baer's family, fearing increasing persecution, moved from Germany to New York City in 1938, just two months prior to Kristallnacht, while Baer was a teenager. Baer would later become a naturalized United States citizen.

In the United States, he was self-taught and worked in a factory for a weekly wage of twelve dollars. After seeing an advertisement at a bus station for education in the budding electronics field, he quit his job to study in the field. He graduated from the National Radio Institute as a radio service technician in 1940. In 1943 he was drafted to fight in World War II and assigned to military intelligence at the United States Army headquarters in London. On returning from war duty in 1946, he presented a large collection of weaponry he had amassed (about ) to museums in Aberdeen, Maryland; Springfield, Missouri; and Fort Riley, Kansas. With his secondary education funded by the G.I. Bill, Baer graduated with a Bachelor of Science degree in Television Engineering, which was unique at the time, from the American Television Institute of Technology in Chicago in 1949.

In 1949, Baer went to work as chief engineer for a small electro-medical equipment firm called Wappler, Inc. There he designed and built surgical cutting machines, epilators, and low frequency pulse generating muscle-toning equipment. In 1951, Baer went to work as a senior engineer for Loral Electronics in Bronx, New York, where he designed power line carrier signaling equipment, contracting for IBM. From 1952 to 1956, he worked at Transitron, Inc., in New York City as a chief engineer and later as vice president.

He started his own company before joining defense contractor Sanders Associates in Nashua, New Hampshire (now part of BAE Systems Inc.) in 1956, where he stayed until retiring in 1987. Baer's primary responsibility at Sanders was overseeing about 500 engineers in the development of electronic systems being used for military applications. Out of this work came the concept of a home video game console. He would go on to create the first commercial video game consoles, among several other patented advances in video games and electronic toys. As he approached retirement, Baer partnered with Bob Pelovitz of Acsiom, LLC, and they invented and marketed toy and game ideas from 1983 until Baer's death.

Baer was a Life Senior Member of Institute of Electrical and Electronics Engineers. His son, Mark, helped lead the nomination process to elevate him to become an IEEE Life Fellow, the highest level of membership within the organization.

Family and death 
Baer married Dena Whinston in 1952; she died in 2006. They had three children during their marriage, and at the time of Baer's death, he had four grandchildren. Baer died at his home in Manchester, New Hampshire on December 6, 2014, according to family and friends close to him.

Inventions 

Baer is considered to have been the inventor of video games, specifically of the concept of the home video game console. In 1966, while an employee at Sanders Associates, Baer started to explore the possibility of playing games on television screens. He first got the idea while working at Loral in 1951, another electronics company, however, they wanted nothing to do with it at the time. In a 2007 interview, Baer said that he recognized that the price reduction of owning a television set at the time had opened a large potential market for other applications, considering that various military groups had identified ways of using television for their purposes. Upon coming up with the idea of creating a game using the television screen, he wrote a four-page proposal with which he was able to convince one of his supervisors to allow him to proceed. He was given US$2,500 and the time of two other engineers, Bill Harrison and Bill Rusch. They developed the "Brown Box" console video game system, so named because of the brown tape in which they wrapped the units to simulate wood veneer. Baer recounted that in an early meeting with a patent examiner and his attorney to patent one of the prototypes, he had set up the prototype on a television in the examiner's office and "within 15 minutes, every examiner on the floor of that building was in that office wanting to play the game". The Brown Box was ultimately patented on April 17, 1973, given U.S. Patent No. 3728480, and became jointly owned by Ralph Baer and BAE Systems.

Baer began seeking a buyer for the system, turning to various television manufacturers who did not see interest in the unit. In 1971, it was licensed to Magnavox, and after being renamed Magnavox Odyssey, the console was released to the public in May 1972. For a time it was Sanders' most profitable line, selling over 340,000 units, though many in the company looked down on game development. Baer is credited for creating  the first light gun and game for home television use, sold grouped with a game expansion pack for the Odyssey, and collectively known as the Shooting Gallery. The light gun itself was the first peripheral for a video game console.

The success of the Odyssey led to competition from other companies, in particular Atari, Inc., led by Nolan Bushnell at the time. Bushnell saw Baer's successful devices and was able to create the first arcade machine in 1972 based on Baer's Table Tennis idea, resulting in Pong. The success was very limited though, due to the high price and confusing advertising. Sanders and Magnavox successfully sued Atari, among numerous others, for patent infringement over Baer's original ideas, and Bushnell opted to settle and negotiated for a license Baer's patents, allowing him to continue Atari's developments in video games. Bushnell led Atari forward to become a leader in both home and arcade video games. This led to a lengthy conflict between Baer and Bushnell over who was the true "father of video games"; Baer was willing to concede this to Bushnell, though noted that Bushnell "has been telling the same nonsensical stories for 40 years". Baer would help both Magnavox and later Coleco to develop competitive units to Atari's products, including the Odyssey 100 and the Odyssey2. Ultimately, the industry came to name Baer as the father of the home video game console, while crediting Bushnell with creating the concept of the arcade machine; Upon Baer's death, Bushnell stated that Baer's "contributions to the rise of videogames should not be forgotten".

Baer is also credited with co-developing three popular electronic games. Baer, along with Howard J. Morrison, developed Simon (1978) and its sequel Super Simon (1979) for Milton Bradley, electronic pattern-matching games that were immensely popular through the late 1990s. Simon was assigned Pat No. 4,207,087 in 1980. Baer also developed a similar pattern-matching game "Maniac" for the Ideal Toy Company (1979) on his own, though the game was not as popular as Simon; Baer considered that Maniac was "really hard to play" and thus not as popular as his earlier game.

In 2006, Baer donated hardware prototypes and documents to the Smithsonian Institution. He continued to tinker in electronics after the death of his wife through at least 2013. By the time of his death, Baer had over 150 patents in his name; in addition to those related to video games, he had patents for electronic greeting cards and for tracking systems for submarines.

Awards 

In addition to being considered "The Father of Video Games", Baer was recognized as a pioneer in the video game field. His accolades include the G-Phoria Legend Award (2005), the IEEE Masaru Ibuka Consumer Electronics Award (2008), the Game Developers Conference Developers Choice "Pioneer" award (2008), and the IEEE Edison Medal (2014). Baer was posthumously given the Pioneer Award by the Academy of Interactive Arts and Sciences at the 2015 Game Developers Conference.

On February 13, 2006, Baer was awarded the National Medal of Technology by President George W. Bush in honor of his "groundbreaking and pioneering creation, development and commercialization of interactive video games". On April 1, 2010, Baer was inducted into the National Inventors Hall of Fame at a ceremony at the United States Department of Commerce in Washington, D.C. While Baer's contributions had generally been overlooked by more recent advances in video game technology development, Baer had stated "In view of the fact that the President of the United States of America hung the National Medal of Technology around my neck in a White House ceremony in 2006, and in view of my having been inducted into the National Inventors Hall of Fame, I really don't feel neglected."

On May 10, 2019, a statue was placed in his honor in Arms Park in Manchester, New Hampshire, and the area of downtown Manchester around it renamed as Baer Square.

On April 8, 2021, the United States Mint announced that Baer and "Handball" would be honored as part of the American Innovation dollars program.

Memory stones at Baer Square 

The memorial was funded through a Kickstarter fundraising campaign. On the floor in front of the Ralph Baer statue are stones with individual inscriptions. Donors of a certain amount were allowed to choose the text for their stone. One element features a binary-code, translating to the ASCII codes for the word Muir, the name of its donor, Kelley Muir.

References

Further reading

External links 

 Ralph Baer Consultants
 Ralph Baer's US patents
 Information about Ralph Baer's book Videogames: In The Beginning
  Ralph H. Baer Papers, 1943–1953, 1966–1972, 2006 – Ralph Baer's prototypes and documentation housed at the Smithsonian Lemelson Center.
 The Dot Eaters entry on Baer and the history of the Odyssey console ("Odyssey - Ralph Baer's Strange Odyssey")
 A Ralph Baer biography
 Ralph H. Baer profile  at The Escapist magazine.
 "The Right to Baer Games – An Interview with Ralph Baer, the Father of Video Games" – From GamaSutra and the March 2007 edition of Game Developer magazine.
 pongmuseum.com – Information about Ralph Baer and his invention "Video Ping-Pong"'
 Podcast Interview Ralph Baer on "We Talk Games." [Timecode, 01:05:58]
 History of Video Games with documents and videos of Baers Inventions
 1 Hour Skype Video Interview Ralph Baer Interview for Scene World Magazine
 Ralph Baer's workshop, icon of American innovation blog post from National Museum of American History
 Ralph Baer: The inventor I knew from National Museum of American History blog

1922 births
2014 deaths
People from Rodalben
People from the Palatinate (region)
20th-century American inventors
21st-century American inventors
Academy of Interactive Arts & Sciences Pioneer Award recipients
United States Army personnel of World War II
American people of German-Jewish descent
American electrical engineers
American mechanical engineers
American technology company founders
American technology chief executives
American video game designers
Businesspeople from New Hampshire
Early history of video games
Game Developers Conference Pioneer Award recipients
IEEE Edison Medal recipients
Jewish emigrants from Nazi Germany to the United States
Jewish engineers
Jewish video game developers
National Medal of Technology recipients
United States Army soldiers
Video game developers
20th-century American businesspeople
Ritchie Boys